Kripasur Sherpa is a member of the 2nd Nepalese Constituent Assembly. He won the Bhojpur–1 seat in the 2013 Nepalese Constituent Assembly election for the Communist Party of Nepal (Unified Marxist-Leninist).

References

Year of birth missing (living people)
Living people
Communist Party of Nepal (Unified Marxist–Leninist) politicians
Members of the 2nd Nepalese Constituent Assembly